Phaea flavovittata is a species of beetle in the family Cerambycidae. It was described by Henry Walter Bates in 1881. It is known from Mexico to Costa Rica.

References

flavovittata
Beetles described in 1881